Deuces is an album by the Charlie Daniels Band. Released on October 9, 2007, it consists of duets with prominent rock, country and bluegrass artists, including covers of songs by Ray Charles and Bob Dylan. Guests on the album include Dolly Parton, Darius Rucker, Brenda Lee, Vince Gill, the Del McCoury Band, Brad Paisley, Brooks & Dunn and Gretchen Wilson. An expanded edition, entitled Duets was released on July 16, 2021, which includes 6 additional tracks, including a duet with Garth Brooks.

Critical reception

Deuces received three stars out of five on Allmusic. In its review by Stephen Thomas Erlewine, he concludes that "Deuces is a clever title for a collection of duets between Charlie Daniels and a bunch of other country stars, ranging from Gretchen Wilson to Vince Gill, Dolly Parton to Brad Paisley. Although the song selection may be a little bit too predictable, Deuces isn't about the songs, it's about the performances, and there's a bunch of great ones here, with the CDB always sounding in top form, sometimes really catching fire with their guests, as when they dig into "Evangeline" with the Del McCoury Band, trade riffs with Paisley on "Jammin' for Stevie," and lay into "God Save Us All from Religion" with Marty Stuart."

Track listing
 "What'd I Say" (with Travis Tritt)
 "Signed, Sealed, Delivered" (with Bonnie Bramlett)
 "Jackson" (with Gretchen Wilson)
 "The Night They Drove Old Dixie Down" (with Vince Gill)
 "Maggie's Farm" (with Earl Scruggs, Gary Scruggs, and Randy Scruggs)
 "Daddy's Old Fiddle" (with Dolly Parton)
 "Like A Rolling Stone" (with Darius Rucker)
 "Evangeline" (with Del McCoury Band)
 "Let It Be Me" (with Brenda Lee)
 "Long Haired Country Boy" (with Brooks & Dunn)
 "God Save Us All From Religion" (with Marty Stuart)
 "Drinkin' My Baby Goodbye" (with Montgomery Gentry)
 "Jammin for Stevie" (with Brad Paisley)

Personnel
Charlie Daniels - Fiddle, guitar, vocals
Joel "Taz" DiGregorio - Keyboards, Hammond organ, piano, vocals
Charlie Hayward - Electric bass
Chris Wormer - Guitar, acoustic guitar, electric guitar, vocals
Bruce Ray Brown - Acoustic guitar, electric guitar, vocals
Pat McDonald - Drums, percussion
Alan Bartram - bass
Jason Carter - Fiddle
Carolyn Corlew - Background vocals
Kevin Haynie - Banjo
Chris Layton - Drums
Del McCoury - Guitar
Rob McCoury - Banjo
Ronnie McCoury - Mandolin
Tommy Shannon - Bass
Bonnie Bramlett - Background vocals, guest appearance
Vince Gill - Guest appearance
Brenda Lee - Guest appearance
Montgomery Gentry - Guest appearance
Brad Paisley - Composer, guitar, guest appearance
Dolly Parton - Composer, guest appearance
Darius Rucker - Guest appearance
Earl Scruggs - Banjo, background vocals, guest appearance
Gary Scruggs - Guitar, vocals, guest appearance
Randy Scruggs - Guitar, background vocals, guest appearance
Marty Stuart - Guest appearance
Travis Tritt - Guest appearance
Gretchen Wilson - Guest appearance

Chart performance

References 

2007 albums
Charlie Daniels albums
E1 Music albums